The Party for Rural Hungary (VMP), was an agrarianist political party in Hungary.

The party, founded in Tiszaderzs, contested in the 1990 parliamentary election with one individual candidate (Dezső Herédy) for Karcag (Jász-Nagykun-Szolnok County Constituency VIII), but did not obtain a mandate. After 1990 the VMP did not contest any further elections and became technically defunct. During the 1990 local elections, Herédy was elected mayor of Tiszaderzs, holding the position until 1992 and from 2002 to 2014.

Election results

National Assembly

References

Sources

Agrarian parties in Hungary
Political parties established in 1989
Political parties disestablished in 1990
1989 establishments in Hungary
1990 disestablishments in Hungary
Defunct political parties in Hungary